Erdene is a Mongolian name and surname. The name is spelled "Эрдэнэ" in Mongol Cyrillic.

Popularity
In Mongolia, Erdene is a component of the most popular name in the country, Bat-Erdene, meaning "firm jewel".

People
Uranchimegiin Mönkh-Erdene
Badmaanyambuugiin Bat-Erdene
Luvsannamsrain Oyun-Erdene

Mongolian given names